Po Hing Fong is a street in Sheung Wan, Hong Kong. It is also a cul-de-sac.

In recent years, it has transformed into a new funky neighborhood in Hong Kong and nicknamed "PoHo" as more artists and interesting shops, such as bohemian cafés, boutiques and design studios, have moved in.

History
Po Hing Fong was an original site of one of the Tong Meng Hui Reception Centres, an anti-Qing revolutionary organisation led by Dr. Sun Yat-sen, to provide asylums for revolutionaries.

Chau Siu-ki, a prominent Hong Kong businessman used to own two houses at Po Hing Fong. Sir Cecil Clementi, the then Governor of Hong Kong, lived at one of Chau's houses when he was a civil servant.

On 17 July 1925 shortly before 9 a.m., an extensive wall behind the houses near the Caine Road-Ladder Street end undermined by the heavy rains of the past three days. The flood gave out and swept away seven houses on Po Hing Fong where thirty families inhabited. Nearly eighty people were killed in the disaster, among those were Chau Siu-ki and many of his family members. Chau Tsun-nin, Chau Siu-ki's son, miraculous survived, due to his having fallen from his bed under a table which supported the weight of the bricks. Chau Tsun-nin later became member of the Executive Council and Legislative Council of Hong Kong.

Notable residents
 Sir Cecil Clementi, Governor of Hong Kong
 Chau Siu-ki, Hong Kong insurance and shipping magnate, real estate developer and member of the Legislative Council.
 Sir Chau Tsun-nin, barrister, businessman and member of the Executive Council and Legislative Council.

See also
List of streets and roads in Hong Kong

References

External links

 The Po Hing Fong Disaster in 1925, at Hong Kong Observatory website
 

Sheung Wan
Roads on Hong Kong Island